Tobravirus is a genus of viruses, in the family Virgaviridae. Plants serve as natural hosts. There are three species in this genus. Diseases associated with this genus include: SBWMV: green and yellow mosaic.

Taxonomy
The following three species are assigned to the genus:
Pea early-browning virus
Pepper ringspot virus
Tobacco rattle virus

Structure
Viruses in the genus Tobravirus are non-enveloped, with rod-shaped geometries, and helical symmetry. The diameter is around 22 nm, with two lengths: 46-115 nm and 180–215 nm. Genomes are linear and segmented, bipartite, positive-sense, single-stranded RNA around 26.84.5kb in total length (8600–11300 nucleotides for each length).

Life cycle
Viral replication is cytoplasmic. Entry into the host cell is achieved by penetration into the host cell. Replication follows the positive stranded RNA virus replication model. Positive stranded RNA virus transcription is the method of transcription. Translation takes place by suppression of termination. The virus exits the host cell by monopartite non-tubule guided viral movement. Plants serve as the natural host. The virus is transmitted via a vector (mechanical nematodes trichodorus and paratrichodorus). Transmission routes are vector and mechanical.

References

External links
 ICTV Online (10th) Report Virgaviridae
 Viralzone: Tobravirus

Virgaviridae
Virus genera